Feuillée is a small lunar impact crater in the eastern part of the Mare Imbrium. It was named after French natural scientist Louis Feuillée. It lies less than a half crater diameter to the northwest of Beer, and the two formations form a nearly matched pair. To the west is the small but prominent crater Timocharis.

Like Beer, Feuillée is a circular, bowl-shaped formation with a small interior floor at the midpoint of the sloping inner walls. This sharp-edged crater is not notably worn or eroded, and lacks any distinguishing features. It does, however, lie across a wrinkle ridge in the surface of the lunar mare, a feature that is best observed under oblique lighting conditions when the crater is near the terminator.

The crater name is incorrectly spelled Feuillet on some lunar charts.

References

External links
 Beer Lunar Topographic Orthophotomap, LTO41A4, May 1974

Impact craters on the Moon
Mare Imbrium